Eye Q was a record label founded in 1990 by Sven Väth, Matthias Hoffmann and Heinz Roth.  It was based in Offenbach, Germany, specialized in trance music and greatly influenced the Sound of Frankfurt.  Eye Q ceased operations in 1997 due to financial problems.

Harthouse and Recycle or Die were sublabels founded in 1992

See also 
 List of record labels

External links
 

German record labels
Record labels established in 1990
Record labels disestablished in 1997
Trance record labels
German companies established in 1990
German companies disestablished in 1997